This is the list of presidents of Tuscany since 1970. The presidents of the regional administration were, from 1970 to 1995, elected by the Regional Council. Since the 1995 reform law, the president of the Tuscany Region is an elective office.

References

Politicians of Tuscany
Tuscany
Government of Tuscany